Vladislav Vladimirovich Panteleyev (born 15 August 1996) is a Russian football player. He plays as a central midfielder for FC Arsenal Tula.

Club career
He made his professional debut in the Russian Professional Football League for FC Spartak-2 Moscow on 15 April 2014 in a game against FC Spartak Ryazan. He made his debut for the main squad of FC Spartak Moscow on 26 September 2018 in a Russian Cup game against FC Chernomorets Novorossiysk. He played his first Russian Premier League game for Spartak on 11 November 2018 in a game against FC Ufa as a 65th-minute substitute for Denis Glushakov.

On 27 December 2018, he signed a 3.5-year contract with FC Rubin Kazan. He left Rubin by mutual consent on 26 June 2019.

On 27 June 2019, he signed a 2-year contract with FC Arsenal Tula.

Career statistics

References

External links

1996 births
People from Aleksinsky District
Sportspeople from Tula Oblast
Living people
Russian footballers
Russia youth international footballers
Russia under-21 international footballers
Association football midfielders
FC Spartak-2 Moscow players
FC Spartak Moscow players
FC Rubin Kazan players
FC Khimik-Arsenal players
FC Arsenal Tula players
Russian Premier League players
Russian First League players
Russian Second League players